IF Troja-Ljungby is a Swedish ice hockey club from Ljungby, Sweden. They are currently playing in the third highest league in Sweden, Hockeyettan.

External links
Official homepage

Ice hockey teams in Sweden
Ice hockey teams in Kronoberg County
1948 establishments in Sweden
Ice hockey clubs established in 1948
Classical mythology in popular culture